Union is an unincorporated community in Clay Township, Pike County, in the U.S. state of Indiana.

History
A post office was established at Union in 1845, and remained in operation until 1955. The community may be named after Uniontown, Pennsylvania, the native home of an early settler.

Geography

References

Unincorporated communities in Pike County, Indiana
Unincorporated communities in Indiana